"I've Known No War" is a song by English rock band the Who, originally released on their tenth studio album It's Hard (1982). Written by Pete Townshend, the song reflects personal thoughts on the Cold War, and contains lyrics referring to the end of World War II:

Townshend felt confident about the song, even stating that he felt it was possibly one of the best tracks the Who ever did.

Parke Puterbaugh of Rolling Stone magazine stated that the song was the key to the album, as he wrote in his 1982 review of It's Hard:

References

The Who songs
1982 songs
Songs written by Pete Townshend
Song recordings produced by Glyn Johns
Songs about nuclear war and weapons
Songs about World War II